Nupserha nigricollis is a species of beetle in the family Cerambycidae. It was described by Stephan von Breuning in 1960. The species is approximately 9 millimeters long and is found in India. Its holotype was a male beetle collected by Breuning in Assam in 1960.

References

Stephan von Breuning (entomologist)
nigricollis
Beetles described in 1960